Howard Philip Milstein (born May 15, 1951) is an American businessman.  Milstein is chairman, president and chief executive officer of New York Private Bank & Trust and its operating bank, Emigrant Bank. Emigrant is the country's 9th largest privately run bank and the largest family-owned private bank. Milstein is founding chairman of the merchant bank FriedbergMilstein. He is a significant investor in golf-related businesses and was named one of the top 25 most powerful people in golf by Golf Inc. He served as chairman of the New York State Thruway Authority until November 2014 and led the procurement process for the replacement of the Tappan Zee Bridge.

Early life and education
Milstein is the elder son of the late Irma Cameron and the late real estate developer Paul Milstein. Milstein is a graduate of Cornell University with a B.A. in economics, summa cum laude (1973).  At Harvard University, he earned law and business degrees in the JD/MBA Program (1977).  He was admitted to the New York State Bar, and is a member of the Federal Bar Council and the American, New York State and New York City Bar Associations. He is of Jewish descent.

Career
Milstein started his career at the investment bank Warburg Paribas Becker. Milstein is chairman, president and chief executive officer of New York Private Bank & Trust and its operating bank, Emigrant Bank. Under Milstein's leadership, the bank created three internet banks in the United States—Dollar Savings Direct, EmigrantDirect and MySavingsDirect.  Milstein is also Chairman of Emigrant Partners and Chairman of Sarasota Private Bank & Trust and Cleveland Private Bank & Trust, both with majority ownership by Milstein and his family along with local co-founders. Milstein is chairman of Milstein Properties, a builder and investor active in both residential and commercial development primarily in New York City,.

Milstein and his brother, Edward, worked with their father on numerous building projects in Manhattan. In the late 1980s, the Milstein family acquired Douglas Elliman-Gibbons & Ives real estate brokerage, and Milstein served as its chairman for ten years until the business was sold. In 1986, Milstein started Liberty Cable as an alternative telecommunications supplier for the Milford Plaza Hotel. In 2014, Milstein partnered with his son, Michael, to create Grand Central Tech, a tech incubator and accelerator, with the goal of being a catalyst for the creation of an ecosystem for startup companies in New York City. In 2018, Milstein took the initiative further with the launch of "Company," a technology campus in midtown with 1 million square feet of office space redesigned for and dedicated to technology companies which seek to attract innovators and millennial talent.
  
In 2007, Milstein acquired, through Emigrant Bank, a full partnership interest in Nicklaus Companies, LLC, becoming Executive Chairman of the Company, working with professional golfer Jack Nicklaus. The business was primarily centered in golf course design, golf equipment, and licensing for clothing and other items. In 2018, Milstein formed 8AM Golf, the holding company for Nicklaus Companies, which operates various global golfing brands, including GOLF Magazine and Golf.com.

Civic

In November 2010, Milstein was selected by Andrew Cuomo to be on the incoming New York governor's transition team as a member of the Committee on Economic Development & Labor. In June 2011, the New York State Senate unanimously confirmed Milstein as chair of the New York State Thruway Authority.  It was under Milstein’s leadership that the Thruway Authority saved $2 billion in projected costs and the project an important example of the impact of a “Design-Build” process and its application to other transformational infrastructure projects.  Milstein partnered with the Regional Plan Association (RPA) to sponsor the "Milstein Forums on New York's Infrastructure: Creating a 21st Century Infrastructure System for the New York Metropolitan Region." Milstein was joined by co-chairs Senator Joseph Lieberman and Governor Ed Rendell. In addition, Milstein created the Zuccotti Lifetime Achievement Award with the RPA to honor colleague and friend John Zuccotti. The 2022 recipient of the award was Senate Majority Leader Chuck Schumer and past recipients include U.S. President Joe Biden, the Honorable Henry Cisneros, Anthony Coscia, Chairman of Amtrak and Rick Cotton, Executive Director of The Port Authority of New York and New Jersey. The annual Award recognizes leaders who make significant contributions to the infrastructure and environment in the tri-state metropolitan region. In 2021, Milstein was appointed Chairman of the Regional Plan Association's Committee on Critical Infrastructure. In February, 2022, Milstein moderated a panel with New York State Governor Kathy Hochul entitled, "Rebuilding New York" along with former Congressman Steve Israel and Janette Sadik-Khan

Cornell University announced the "Milstein State of Democracy Address Series" with the former President Bill Clinton as the featured speaker for the first program. The initiative is part of Cornell University's "Campaign for the Future of Democracy," an effort whose goal is to promote resilience of our political system and support of democratic norms.

Philanthropy
Milstein runs a philanthropic organization, the Howard and Abby Milstein Foundation, with his wife focused on initiatives such as global health, national security, education, and economic prosperity. In 2012, Milstein and his wife, Abby, Vice Chairman of the New York Public Library, committed to donate $8 million to the New York Public Library. Milstein serves as the Chairman of the Board of the American Skin Association and serves on the Board of the Nicklaus Children's Health Care Foundation. He is former Chairman of the New York Blood Center and the Jones Foundation for Reproductive Medicine. Milstein is on the board of the National September 11 Memorial Foundation. Milstein and his wife Abby were underwriters of the PBS documentary in commemoration of the anniversary of 9/11, Objects and Memory.

At Cornell University, Milstein is trustee and presidential counselor and overseer, also a founding member of the New York City Cornell Club, which opened in its current home on East 44th street in 1989.  Milstein helped fund the building of the Paul Milstein Building for the College of Architecture, Art and Planning, dedicated in 2007. In October, 2017, on behalf of the Milstein family, he announced a $20 million donation for a new initiative to promote integration of technology and the humanities, a collaboration between the Cornell University College of Arts and Sciences and Cornell Tech.

Milstein’s philanthropy extends to large-scale gifts to assist individual members and first responders of communities impacted by natural disasters and other crises.  In 2005, Milstein and Emigrant Bank donated $1 million in funds directly into the accounts of customers impacted by Hurricane Katrina. In 2012, Milstein and the bank donated $2.3 million to first responders whose homes and families were impacted by Superstorm Sandy. In 2021, Milstein and the bank donated 1 million N95 protective masks to hospitals and first responders during the height of the COVID-19 pandemic.  In 2022, Milstein and Sarasota Private Trust Co. partnered with Goodwill Manasota to distribute $1 million in support to community members impacted by Hurricane Ian.

Honors
In April, 2014, Milstein received the Insignia of Chevalier in the Legion of Honor—the French Legion of Honor. In 2008, he was named the Entrepreneur of the Year by Cornell University. In recognition of Milstein's leadership role in advancing the replacement of the Tappan Zee Bridge, he received the Regional Plan Association's Lifetime Achievement Award in 2013.

Publications
A Prophet for Our Time: An Anthology of the Writings of Rabbi Marc H. Tanenbaum, Fordham University Press, 2002
A Guide for Immigrants in New York City, St. Martin's Press, 2004
No Time to Wait: Overcoming Gaps in TB Research & Development, Medecins Sans Frontiere, 2008
Lox, Stocks & Backstage Broadway:  Iconic Trades of New York City, Smithsonian Scholarly Press

Personal life
He is married to Abby Sniderman Milstein; Chair of the Board of Trustees of the New York Public Library, and founding partner in the law firm of Constantine Cannon, LLP., and they have one son, Michael (born c. 1989).

References

1951 births
Living people
American bankers
American billionaires
American corporate directors
American financiers
American Jews
American real estate businesspeople
Businesspeople from New York (state)
Cornell University alumni
Harvard Law School alumni
New York Islanders executives